WZOT (1220 kHz) is a commercial AM Christian radio station broadcasting a Southern Gospel format, including Christian talk and teaching shows. Licensed to Rockmart, Georgia, United States, the station is owned by Mark Lumpkin and Mark Garrett, through licensee Heirborn Broadcasting, LLC.  It uses the slogan "Singing News Radio."

WZOT broadcasts by day at 500 watts.  But because AM 1220 is a Mexican clear channel frequency, WZOT must reduce power at night to 103 watts to avoid interfering with Class A XEB in Mexico City.

WZOT is also heard on 240 watt FM translator W270CE at 101.9 MHz in Rome.

History 
On August 28, 1959, the station first signed on as WPLK.  Originally it was a daytimer, required to go off the air at night.  In 1972, it added an FM station, 107.1 WZOT.  In the 1980s, when the FM station was sold and switched its call sign to WTSH-FM, the AM station switched its call letters to WZOT.

References

External links

ZOT
Southern Gospel radio stations in the United States